Bastard, Go and Kill is a 1971 Italian Spaghetti Western film written and directed by Gino Mangini and starring George Eastman.

Plot
The young Mexican Peon Chako is hunted and almost hanged by a group of Americans because of the seduction of the young Susanna. However, he manages to escape and return to Mexico. The experienced bounty hunter Slim follows him and wants to collect the premium for Chako. He catches him but is tricked by him and left in the desert. Chako has now arrived in San Rosario, where he is worshipped as a hero; only the jealous Asuncion sees it differently. She has him thrown into prison. However, the corrupt official receives a higher price from the American, who has now also arrived.

The large landowner Don Felipe meanwhile has two men standing in the way of his shops; he lets henchman Sanchez do the dirty work and then shift the blame onto Chako. So Chako is in jail again; but Slim uses the confusion of a big party to free him and thus to anticipate the murder gang of the now hired Cherokee.

Slim now collaborates with Chako; the two manage to shut down Sanchez, who has meanwhile killed Don Felipe, and restore peace in this area. Slim delivers Sanchez to prison and Chako to Asuncion.

Cast

See also
 List of Italian films of 1971

References

External links

Bastard, Go and Kill at Variety Distribution

Spaghetti Western films
1971 Western (genre) films
1971 films
Films scored by Carlo Rustichelli
1970s Italian-language films
1970s Italian films